Thulium chloride may refer to:

 Thulium(II) chloride (thulium dichloride), TmCl2
 Thulium(III) chloride (thulium trichloride), TmCl3